The Minister of Justice, subsequently Minister for Justice, was a ministry in the administration of New South Wales, established in 1880 in the third ministry of Henry Parkes and abolished in 2017. The position supports the Attorney General and was sometimes, although not always, held concurrently with that office.

Role and responsibilities
Prior to 1880 the Minister of Justice and Public Instruction was responsible for the administration of the courts, sheriff and coroner, as well as the Council of Education, orphan schools, the public library, Australian Museum and observatory. In 1880 the ministry was split into the Minister of Justice and the Minister of Public Instruction following the passage of the Public Instruction Act of 1880 which required a minister to assume the responsibilities of the former Council of Education.

The minister also assumed responsibility for prisons which had previously been the responsibility of the Colonial Secretary, however the Colonial Secretary retained responsibility for police. The Minister for Justice was briefly responsible for Police from 1974 until 1975. In 1978 the minister ceased to be responsible for prisons which became the responsibility of the Minister for Corrective Services.

The ministry was held by the Attorney General in the third to sixth Wran ministries and was formally subsumed into the responsibilities of the Attorney General in the seventh Wran ministry in 1984. The portfolio was re-created in 1991, known for three weeks as the Minister for Courts Administration and Corrective Services, before returning to the name Minister for Justice. The ministry was abolished in the First Carr ministry in 1995, with justice returning to be the responsibility of the Attorney General, and juvenile justice being the responsibility of a separate minister. It was re-created in the Fourth Carr ministry in 2003 and was abolished in the Rees ministry in 2011. The portfolio was re-created in the O'Farrell ministry in 2011, combined with the portfolio of police in 2015 and was abolished in the first Berejiklian ministry in 2017, replaced by the Minister for Counter Terrorism.

List of Ministers for Justice

Former ministerial titles

Justice and Public Instruction

Notes

References

Justice
Justice ministers